What's Up with That may refer to:

Film and TV
"What Up with That?", a Saturday Night Live sketch by Kenan Thompson begun in 2009
"What's up with that?" punchline of the April Fool in the Nickelodeon animated series The Fairly OddParents

Internet
Watts Up With That?, a blog discussing climate change

Music
"What Up With That", song in the Saturday Night Live sketch, featuring Fred Armisen Giuseppe as the saxophone player
"What's Up with That" (ZZ Top song), 1996 single composed by Billy Gibbons and Joe Hardy
"What's Up with That", single by Scotty Emerick, featured in the soundtrack to the film Broken Bridges 2006
"What's Up with That", music video by Veronica Ballestrini 2007
"What's Up With That", song by Master P (featuring Silk) from Get Away Clean 1991
"What's Up With That", song by Curtis Salgado from Clean Getaway 2008 	
"What's Up With That", song by The Dictators
"What's Up With That", song by Pee Wee Ellis composed by Alfred Ellis
"What's Up With That Girl?", single by Shocking Pinks
"What's Up with That Woman", song by Buddy Guy from Rhythm & Blues